Brading Day is an annual community event held on the first weekend in July at Beechgrove Playing Fields, Brading, Isle of Wight. The first event was in 1285 when King Edward I gave the people of Brading the right to hold an annual fair by Royal Charter.

External links 
Official Website

Festivals on the Isle of Wight
1285 establishments in England
Culture on the Isle of Wight
Recurring events established in 1285
Festivals established in 1285
Brading